Tønder Listen is a Danish local political party from Tønder Municipality.

History
In 2020 Henrik Frandsen lost the support from Venstre to stand for re-election as mayor in the 2021 Tønder municipal election. This resulted in Henrik Frandsen, who was mayor at the time for Venstre, to leave the party and create Tønder Listen. 5 other city council members from Venstre would join the party, while 9 would stay at Venstre.

In the 2021 Tønder municipal election the party would become biggest party with 29% of the vote and 9 seats, while Venstre would lose 9 seats. However, there was not a majority to support Henrik Frandsen as mayor.

Henrik Frandsen would later join the Moderates nationally, and stepped down as leader of Tønder Listen. He would locally remain a party member, however Anita Uggerholt Eriksen would become leader.

Election results

Municipal elections

References

Notes 

Local political parties in Denmark